The 2009 Eurocup Formula Renault 2.0 season was the nineteenth Eurocup Formula Renault 2.0 season. The season began at Circuit de Catalunya on April 18 and finished at the Ciudad del Motor de Aragón on October 25, after fourteen rounds. This season was the last for the current specification Tatuus chassis introduced in 2000, as a new chassis will be introduced for the 2010 season. Albert Costa won the title holding off the challenges of Jean-Éric Vergne and António Félix da Costa, who finished tied on points, with Vergne finishing second on a tie-breaker.

Teams and drivers
 This season saw a cap on entries, with the lineup being capped at 38 entries, depending on the circuit. Guest entries are listed in italics.

Race calendar

Championship standings

Drivers
Points are awarded to the drivers as follows:

* – only awarded to race one polesitters

† — Drivers did not finish the race, but were classified as they completed over 90% of the race distance.

Teams

References

External links
 Official website of the Eurocup Formula Renault 2.0 championship

Eurocup
Eurocup Formula Renault
Renault Eurocup